The following lists events that happened during 1992 in Laos.

Incumbents
President: Kaysone Phomvihane (until 21 November), Nouhak Phoumsavanh (starting 25 November)
Prime Minister: Khamtai Siphandon

Events

December
20 December - 1992 Laotian parliamentary election

Births
9 March - Soukaphone Vongchiengkham, footballer
10 July - Konekham Inthammavong, footballer
26 September - Manolom Phomsouvanh, footballer
23 November - Ketsada Souksavanh, footballer
30 November - Keoviengphet Liththideth, footballer
9 December - Sopha Saysana, footballer

Deaths
21 November - Kaysone Phomvihane, leader of the Lao People's Revolutionary Party (b. 1920)

References

 
Years of the 20th century in Laos
Laos
1990s in Laos
Laos